Lee Jong-hyun (born February 5, 1994) is a South Korean professional basketball player. He plays for Goyang Orion Orions and the South Korean national team.

Early years
Lee started playing basketball in elementary school under the influence of his father, a former basketball player with Busan Kia Enterprise (which is now Ulsan Hyundai Mobis Phoebus). He was schoolmates with Moon Seong-gon and Choi Jun-yong at Kyungbock High School and they were dubbed the "Kyungbock Trio" by rival high school teams for their well-rounded offensive capabilities.

College career
Lee would join Moon, a year his senior, at Korea University while Choi went to rivals Yonsei University. At that time, his teammates also included Kang Sang-jae and Lee Seoung-hyun and they were mostly competing against a Kim Jong-kyu and Kim Min-goo-inspired Kyung Hee University in the U-League. During his freshman year, he played a pivotal role in Korea University winning the MBC Cup for the first time in seventeen years and was named MVP of the tournament.

He declared as a prospect in the 2015 NBA Draft on April 22, 2015. As an early entrant in the 2015 NBA draft, he went undrafted. He returned to Korea University to continue his college career. During his junior year, he and Kang Sang-jae, dubbed "Twin Towers" because of their height, led Korea University to a surprise win over a Sangmu team composed of experienced KBL players fulfilling their mandatory military service.

Professional career
Lee was considered one of the "big 3", along with Kang and Choi Jun-yong, of the 2016 KBL rookie draft and strong contenders for the first pick of the first round. He was drafted first overall by Ulsan Hyundai Mobis Phoebus. After an underwhelming start to his rookie season, he scored 24 points and 18 rebounds in January against Changwon LG Sakers.

Throughout 2018 Lee struggled with injury. In February he ruptured his Achilles tendon which effectively ended his season. He spent the off-season in rehabilitation and recovered in time for the 2018–19 season. However, he fractured his left patella in a December game. He was ruled out of the rest of the season as it required surgery.

In November 2020, Lee was traded to Goyang Orion Orions for Choi Jin-soo in a player swap.

National team career
Lee was first called up to the senior national team while in college, participating in the 2013 FIBA Asia Championship. He participated at the 2014 FIBA Basketball World Cup and the Asian Games that same year. The South Koreans won gold for the first time since 2002, which meant that Lee and his teammates who had yet to enlist for mandatory military service were granted exemptions. He missed out on the 2019 FIBA Basketball World Cup due to his injury.

References

External Links
Career Statistics from the Korean Basketball League website 

1994 births
Living people
2014 FIBA Basketball World Cup players
Basketball players at the 2014 Asian Games
Centers (basketball)
Korea University alumni
Kyungbock High School alumni
South Korean men's basketball players
Asian Games medalists in basketball
Asian Games gold medalists for South Korea
Medalists at the 2014 Asian Games
Ulsan Hyundai Mobis Phoebus players
Basketball players from Seoul